Teplychne is a place name in Ukraine which can refer to:
 Teplychne (rural settlement), a rural settlement in the Artemivsk Raion of Luhansk
 Teplychne, Zaporizhia, a former urban-type settlement in Shevchenko Raion of Zaporizhia